Birgit Rodhe (1915-1998) was a Swedish politician of the Liberal  Party. 

She served as Deputy Minister for Education in 1978–1979.

References

1915 births
1998 deaths
20th-century Swedish politicians
20th-century Swedish women politicians
Women government ministers of Sweden
Swedish Ministers for Education